Harry James Wilkinson (second ¼ 1864 – 7 June 1942) was an English rugby union footballer who played in the 1880s. He played at representative level for England, and Yorkshire, and at club level for Halifax, as a forward, e.g. front row, lock, or back row. Prior to Tuesday 27 August 1895, Halifax was a rugby union club.

Background
Harry Wilkinson was born in Halifax, West Riding of Yorkshire, and he died aged 78 in Halifax, West Riding of Yorkshire.

Playing career

International honours
Harry Wilkinson won a cap for England while at Halifax in 1889 against New Zealand Natives, during the match Harry Wilkinson wore his Yorkshire County Shirt rather than an England shirt.

Genealogical information
Harry Wilkinson was the father of the rugby union footballer; Harry Wilkinson.

References

External links
Search for "Wilkinson" at rugbyleagueproject.org
Biography of Arthur Budd with an England team photograph including Harry Wilkinson

1864 births
1942 deaths
England international rugby union players
English rugby union players
Halifax R.L.F.C. players
Rugby union players from Halifax, West Yorkshire
Rugby union forwards
Yorkshire County RFU players